Lieutenant General Mahmoud Freihat (born in 1960, Jerash) is a former Chairman of the Joint Chiefs of Staff of the Jordanian Armed Forces. Freihat was appointed to this position on 2 October 2016 and served until 24 July 2019.

He earned his military commission from Jordan's Royal Military Academy in 1980 and later earned graduate degrees from the United Kingdom's Royal College of Defence Studies and King's College London.

He is the cousin of the historian Khaled Freihat

References

External links

1960 births
Living people
Jordanian generals